G'ville may refer to:

Gladesville, New South Wales
Greenville (disambiguation)